Hi-ReS! or Handsome information - Radical entertainment Systems! is a London-based design and digital marketing firm known for its elaborate commissioned websites.

Background
Hi-ReS! was founded in 1999 by German designers Alexandra Jugovic and Florian Schmitt. Their first major effort, soulbath.com attracted worldwide attention as an experimental website that questioned the use of banner ads throughout the web. The company came to be known for its use of Flash technology to create immersive websites.

The success of Soulbath subsequently brought the firm their first commercial project, when filmmaker Darren Aronofsky reached out to them about a website for his film Requiem for a Dream. The site went on to critical acclaim winning a Webby award in 2001. This led to a number of websites for films including Richard Kelly's Donnie Darko which went on to win a Webby award and a distinction for Net Excellence by Prix Ars Electronica. The site featured in the 2004 Communicate exhibition curated by Rick Poynor at the Barbican Centre in London.

In January 2008, Hi-ReS! was acquired by Syzygy Group, a subsidiary of British advertising company WPP. The following June saw their first joint project with the international website for German liqueur brand Jägermeister.

Hi-ReS! owns a number of awards to its name, including a BAFTA, Cyber Lion, Clio, D&AD, and Webby Awards.

Hi-ReS! is headquartered in London, England, with offices in New York City, Berlin and Hamburg.

Notable clients

Music
 The Beatles
 Beck
 Massive Attack

Feature films
 Donnie Darko
 Minority Report
 Requiem for a Dream

Theatre and production
 20th Century Fox
 Artisan
 HanWay Films
 HBO
 Lionsgate
 MTV

Cars
 Hyundai
 Lexus
 Mitsubishi
 Toyota

Others
 Chanel
 The Economist
 Esquire
 IBM
 Jägermeister
 Nokia
 Red Bull
 Sony

See also
 Digital Archaeology – a showcase of groundbreaking websites from the early days of the web

References

External links
 
 Archives of client commissioned websites
 Soulbath

Design companies of the United Kingdom
Webby Award winners
Marketing companies established in 1999
British companies established in 1999